Adrien is a 2015 Canadian drama film, written and directed by Renée Beaulieu. The film stars Normand D'Amour as Adrien, a small-town automobile repair shop owner who is confronting his mortality as he awaits a kidney transplant.

The film was shot in Trois-Pistoles, Quebec.

The film garnered three Canadian Screen Award nominations at the 4th Canadian Screen Awards in 2016, in the categories of Best Overall Sound (Sylvain Brassard, Arnaud Têtu, Pascal Van Strydonck and Olivier Léger), Best Editing (Renée Beaulieu) and Best Sound Editing (Benoît Dame).

References

External links 
 

2015 films
Canadian drama films
Quebec films
Films set in Quebec
Films shot in Quebec
2015 drama films
2015 directorial debut films
2010s French-language films
French-language Canadian films
2010s Canadian films